The Carus Mathematical Monographs is a monograph series published by the Mathematical Association of America. Books in this series are intended to appeal to a wide range of readers in mathematics and science.

Scope and audience
While the books are intended to cover nontrivial material, the emphasis is on exposition and clear communication rather than novel results and a systematic Bourbaki-style presentation. The webpage for the series states:

The exposition of mathematical subjects that the monographs contain are set forth in a manner comprehensible not only to teachers and students specializing in mathematics, but also to scientific workers in other fields. More generally, the monographs are intended for the wide circle of thoughtful people familiar with basic graduate or advanced undergraduate mathematics encountered in the study of mathematics itself or in the context of related disciplines who wish to extend their knowledge without prolonged and critical study of the mathematical journals and treatises.

Many of the books in the series have become classics in the genre of general mathematical exposition.

Series listing
Calculus of Variations, by G. A. Bliss (out of print)
Analytic Functions of a Complex Variable, by D. R. Curtiss (out of print)
Mathematical Statistics, by H. L. Rietz (out of print)
Projective Geometry, by J. W. Young (out of print)
A History of Mathematics in America before 1900, by D. E. Smith and Jekuthiel Ginsburg (out of print)
Fourier Series and Orthogonal Polynomials, by Dunham Jackson (out of print)
Vectors and Matrices, by C. C. MacDuffee (out of print)
Rings and Ideals, by N. H. McCoy (out of print)
The Theory of Algebraic Numbers, second edition, by Harry Pollard and Harold G. Diamond
The Arithmetic Theory of Quadratic Forms, by B. W. Jones (out of print)
Irrational Numbers, by Ivan Niven
Statistical Independence in Probability, Analysis and Number Theory, by Mark Kac
A Primer of Real Functions, third edition, by Ralph P. Boas, Jr.
Combinatorial Mathematics, by Herbert John Ryser 
Noncommutative Rings, by I. N. Herstein (out of print) 
Dedekind Sums, by Hans Rademacher and Emil Grosswald (out of print)
The Schwarz Function and its Applications, by Philip J. Davis
Celestial Mechanics, by Harry Pollard (out of print)
Field Theory and its Classical Problems, by Charles Robert Hadlock
The Generalized Riemann Integral, by Robert M. McLeod (out of print)
From Error-Correcting Codes through Sphere Packings to Simple Groups, by Thomas M. Thompson
Random Walks and Electric Networks, by Peter G. Doyle and J. Laurie Snell
Complex Analysis: The Geometric Viewpoint, by Steven G. Krantz
Knot Theory, by Charles Livingston
Algebra and Tiling: Homomorphisms in the Service of Geometry, by Sherman K. Stein and Sándor Szabó
The Sensual (Quadratic) Form, by John H. Conway assisted by Francis Y. C. Fung, 1997, 
A Panorama of Harmonic Analysis, by Steven G. Krantz, 1999, 
Inequalities from Complex Analysis, by John P. D'Angelo, 2002, 
Ergodic Theory of Numbers, by Karma Dajani and Cor Kraaikamp, 2002, 
A Tour through Mathematical Logic, by Robert S. Wolf, 2005, 
Randomness and Recurrence in Dynamical Systems: a Real Analysis Approach, by Rodney Nillsen, 2010, 
Linear Inverse Problems and Tikhonov Regularization, by Mark S. Gockenbach, 2016, 
Near the Horizon: An Invitation to Geometric Optics, by Henk W. Broer, 2017, 
Finding Ellipses: What Blaschke Products, Poncelet’s Theorem, and the Numerical Range Know about Each Other, by Ulrich Daepp, Pamela Gorkin, Andrew Shaffer, and Karl Voss, 2018, 
Field Theory and Its Classical Problems, by Charles Robert Hadlock (reprint of #19)
The Unity of Combinatorics, by Ezra Brown and Richard K. Guy, 2020, 
The Finite Field Distance Problem, by David J. Covert, 2021,

See also
Carus Lectures

References

Series of mathematics books
Monographic series